The Election Commission of India held the first presidential elections of India on 2 May 1952. Dr. Rajendra Prasad won his first election with 507,400 votes (83.81%) over his nearest rival K. T. Shah who got 92,827 votes (15.3%).

Schedule
The election schedule was announced by the Election Commission of India on 4 April 1952.

Results
Source: Web archive of Election Commission of India website

See also
 1952 Indian vice presidential election

References

1952 elections in India
Presidential elections in India
May 1952 events in Asia